Acanthosphinx is a monotypic moth genus in the family Sphingidae erected by Per Olof Christopher Aurivillius in 1891. Its only species, Acanthosphinx guessfeldti, the widow sphinx, was first described by Hermann Dewitz in 1879. It is known from forests from Sierra Leone to the Congo, Angola, Zambia, Malawi, Tanzania and Uganda.

The length of each forewing is 57–70 mm.

The larvae feed on Bridelia micrantha.

References

Smerinthini
Monotypic moth genera
Moths described in 1879
Moths of Africa
Lepidoptera of Cameroon
Lepidoptera of Uganda
Lepidoptera of Malawi
Lepidoptera of Tanzania
Lepidoptera of Angola
Insects of the Central African Republic
Lepidoptera of West Africa
Lepidoptera of Zambia
Taxa named by Per Olof Christopher Aurivillius